Translatio imperii (Latin for "transfer of rule") is a historiographical concept that originated from the Middle Ages, in which history is viewed as a linear succession of transfers of an imperium that invests supreme power in a singular ruler, an "emperor" (or sometimes even several emperors, e.g., the Eastern Roman Empire and the Western Holy Roman Empire). The concept is closely linked to translatio studii (the geographic movement of learning). Both terms are thought to have their origins in the second chapter of the Book of Daniel in the Hebrew Bible (verses 39–40).

Definition 
Jacques Le Goff describes the translatio imperii concept as "typical" for the Middle Ages for several reasons:
 The idea of linearity of time and history was typical for the Middle Ages;
 The translatio imperii idea typically also neglected simultaneous developments in other parts of the world (of no importance to medieval Europeans);
 The translatio imperii idea didn't separate "divine" history from the history of "worldly power": medieval Europeans considered divine (supernatural) and material things as part of the same continuum, which was their reality. Also the causality of one reign necessarily leading to its successor was often detailed by the medieval chroniclers, and is seen as a typical medieval approach.

Each medieval author described the translatio imperii as a succession leaving the supreme power in the hands of the monarch ruling the region of the author's provenance:
 Adso of Montier-en-Der (French area, 10th century): Roman Empire → Carolingian Franks → Saxons
 Otto of Freising (living in German region): Rome → Franks → Longobards → Germans (Holy Roman Empire);
 Chrétien de Troyes (living in medieval France): Greece → Rome → France
 Richard de Bury (England, 14th century): Athens, Greece → Rome → Paris, France → England
 Ibrahim Pasha (Ottoman Empire, 16th century) Roman Empire → Eastern Roman Empire → Seljuk Empire → Sultanate of Rum → Ottoman Empire
 Snorri Sturluson (Prose Edda Prologue, Iceland/Norway, c. 13th century): Troy → Thrúdheim, Thrace → Norway

Later, continued and reinterpreted by modern and contemporary movements and authors (some known examples):
 Fifth Monarchists (England, 17th century): Caldeans (Babylonians) → Persians → Macedonian Empire → Rome → England (and the British Empire later)
 António Vieira (Portugal, 17th century): Assyro-Caldeans (Babylonians) → Persians → Greeks → Romans → Portuguese Empire
 Fernando Pessoa (Portugal, 20th century): Greece → Rome → Christianity → Europe → Portugal

Medieval and Renaissance authors often linked this transfer of power by genealogically attaching a ruling family to an ancient Greek or Trojan hero; this schema was modeled on Virgil's use of Aeneas (a Trojan hero) as progenitor of the city of Rome in his Aeneid.  Continuing with this tradition, the twelfth-century Anglo-Norman authors Geoffrey of Monmouth (in his Historia Regum Britanniae) and Wace (in his Brut) linked the founding of Britain to the arrival of Brutus of Troy, son of Aeneas.

In a similar way, the French Renaissance author Jean Lemaire de Belges (in his Les Illustrations de Gaule et Singularités de Troie) linked the founding of Celtic Gaul to the arrival of the Trojan Francus (i.e. Astyanax), the son of Hector; and of Celtic Germany to the arrival of Bavo, the cousin of Priam; in this way he established an illustrious genealogy for Pepin and Charlemagne (the legend of Francus would also serve as the basis for Ronsard's epic poem, "La Franciade").

From the Roman Empire/Byzantine Empire to the Holy Roman Empire 
The cardinal point in the idea of the translatio imperii is the link between the Eastern Roman Empire and the Holy Roman Empire.
Emperor Constantine I established Constantinople, a New Rome, as a second capital of the Roman Empire in 330.
After the death of Emperor Theodosius I (347–395), the Roman Empire was permanently divided into the Western and the Eastern Roman Empire
With the demise of the Western Empire in 476/480, the Byzantine Empire became the sole Roman Empire.
Byzantine Emperor Constantine V married his son Leo IV to Irene of Athens on 17 December 768, brought to Constantinople by the father on 1 November 768. On 14 January 771, Irene gave birth to a son, Constantine. Following the deaths of Constantine V in 775 and Leo IV in 780, Irene became regent for their nine-year-old son, Constantine VI.
As early as 781, Irene began to seek a closer relationship with the Carolingian dynasty and the Papacy. She negotiated a marriage between her son Constantine and Rotrude, a daughter of the ruling Frankish king, Charlemagne. Irene went as far as to send an official to instruct the Frankish princess in Greek; however, Irene herself broke off the engagement in 787, against her son's wishes. 
As Constantine VI approached maturity, the relationship between mother/regent and son/emperor was increasingly strained. In 797 Irene deposed her son, with his eyes being mutilated, who died before 805.
Some Western authorities considered the Byzantine throne, now occupied by a woman, to be vacant and instead recognized that Charlemagne, who controlled Italy and much part of the former Western Roman Empire, had a valid claim to the imperial title. Pope Leo III, crowned Charlemagne as Roman Emperor in 800, an act not recognized by the Byzantine Empire.
Irene is said to have endeavored to negotiate a marriage between herself and Charlemagne, but according to Theophanes the Confessor, who alone mentioned it, the scheme was frustrated by Aetios, one of her favorites.
 In 802, Empress Irene was deposed by a conspiracy and replaced by Nikephoros I. She was exiled and died the following year.
 Pax Nicephori,  a peace treaty in 803 between the Holy Roman Emperor Charlemagne and Nikephoros I, Basileus of the Eastern Roman Empire.
 Recognition of Charlemagne as Emperor (Basileus) in 812 by Emperor Michael I Rangabe of the Byzantine Empire (crowned on 2 October 811 by the Patriarch of Constantinople), after he reopened negotiations with the Franks. While acknowledging Charlemagne strictly as “Emperor”, Michael only referred to himself as “Emperor of the Romans”. In exchange for that recognition, Venice was returned to the Byzantine Empire.
 On February 2, 962, Otto I was solemnly crowned Holy Roman Emperor by Pope John XII. Ten days later at a Roman synod, Pope John XII, at Otto's desire, founded the Archbishopric of Magdeburg and the Bishopric of Merseburg, bestowed the pallium on the Archbishop of Salzburg and Archbishop of Trier, and confirmed the appointment of Rather as Bishop of Verona. The next day, the emperor issued a decree, the famous Diploma Ottonianum, in which he confirmed the Roman Church in its possessions, particularly those granted by the Donation of Pepin.
 On April 972 14, Otto I married his son and heir Otto II to the Byzantine Princess Theophanu. Through their wedding contract, Otto was recognized as Emperor in the West, a title Theopanu was to assume together with her husband through the Consortium imperii after his death.

From the Inca Empire to the Spanish Empire 
Sayri Túpac, second Inca of Vilcabamba, after negotiating with the viceroy Andrés Hurtado de Mendoza [during January 5, 1558 in Lima], would hand over the rights of his crown to the King of Castile, renouncing his claims as sovereign of the Inca Empire and thus obtain peace with the Spanish and convert to Catholicism; in exchange, he received a pardon from the "superior government", obtained titles to land and income, recognition of the primogeniture of his lineage, and obtaining the Encomienda del Valle de Yucay [Mayorazgo de Oropesa]. Later, his successor Titu Cusi Yupanqui, would ratify this transfer with the signing of the treaty of Acobamba.

This application of the Translatio Imperii, for the Kingdoms of Peru, was invoked as the legitimacy tool, by the Spanish Empire, for its domain in the Viceroyalty of Peru, while, from these treaties, the incorporation of the Tahuantinsuyo in the Spanish Monarchy, with the official recognition of the Inca royal House, which consider the Monarchs of Spain as Kings of Peru, which would encourage the loyalty and fidelity of the Peruvian Monarchists (especially the royalists from the Royal Army of Peru) towards the Spanish monarchy and its promotion of miscegenation.

Given this, the Kings of Spain would be the legitimate successors of the Sapa Incas, therefore, Carlos I of Spain would be succeeding Atahualpa as Emperor of the Kingdoms of Peru, not only in fact, but also in law. Which was referenced in multiple paintings of viceregal art (especially from the School of Cuzco and the Cathedral of Lima), such as the iconic Efigies de los incas o reyes del Perú, present in the Museum of Art of Lima, in which Atahualpa bestows his Scepter of Power to the Spanish Habsburgs (marked with a cross), or the painting by Juan Núñez Vela y Ribera, in the Copacabana monastery, where reference is made to the “poderosissimo Inga D. Carlos II Augustissimo Emperador de la América”. Meanwhile, the King of Spain would flaunt his rights as Sapa Inca, through the title King of the West Indies, which is the sum of the rights of the Inca and Aztec crowns, which has been commemorated with the statues of the Aztec and Inca Emperors at the main entrance of the Royal Palace of Madrid.

This in turn gave guarantees to the Inca Nobility to have recognition of their titles (and traditions of their peoples) in Spanish law, considering themselves twinned with the Spanish Nobility, the indigenous nobility receiving multiple shields and privileges from the Crown. Authors like the Inca Garcilaso de la Vega would make a lot of reference to this Translatio imperii in his works.

The claims of Spanish rights in the Kingdoms of Peru is in this way: Pre-Inca Kingdoms and Andean civilizations → Incan Empire/Tahuantinsuyo → Christianity → Spanish Empire

See also
Four kingdoms of Daniel
Last Roman Emperor
Legacy of the Roman Empire
Succession of the Roman Empire
Problem of two emperors
Moscow, third Rome
Fifth Empire
Seljuk Empire
Sultanate of Rum
Ottoman claim to Roman succession

References

Historiography
Historiography of the Middle Ages
Latin words and phrases
Legacy of the Roman Empire